Live at Dunk! Fest is a live album by American post-metal band Russian Circles, released digitally and on vinyl through Sargent House. The album was recorded on May 7, 2016 at a performance in Zottegem, Belgium. This release marks the band's first live album.

Background
On May 7, 2016, Russian Circles headlined at a festival in Zottegem, Belgium. Unbeknownst to the band, the show was being professionally recorded. In explaining why this worked out for the best, bassist Brian Cook said, “Going into a show with the plan of documenting it on record was never really something we were too excited about. Too much pressure. Good shows aren’t a matter of playing everything perfectly; it’s a matter of creating a good vibe.”

Track listing

Personnel
Credits adapted from liner notes.

Russian Circles
 Mike Sullivan – guitar
 Brian Cook – bass
 Dave Turncrantz – drums
Technical personnel
 Chris Le Dantec – front of house engineer
 Jannes Van Rossom – audio recording
 Dallas Thomas – mixer
 Collin Jordan – mastering
 Error! Design – artwork
 Davy De Pauw – concert photography
 Gosia Wanda – concert photography

References

Russian Circles albums
2016 albums